Kizhakkepainummoodu Easo Mathai, better known by his pen name Parappurath (1924–1981), was an Indian novelist, short story writer and screenwriter who wrote in the Malayalam language. His body of work comprises 20 novels, 14 short story anthologies and 15 screenplays. He was a recipient of the Kerala Sahitya Akademi Award for Story (1966), Kerala Sahitya Akademi Award for Novel (1968) and Kerala State Film Award for Best Story (twice 1970 and 1972), amongst other honours.

Biography 
K. E. Mathai was born on 14 November 1924 in Kunnam, a small village near Mavelikkara in Alappuzha district of the south Indian state of Kerala to Kizhakkepainummoottil Kunjunaina Easo and Sosamma. His early schooling was at the local primary school in Kunnam and later, he joined Chettikulangara High School but he could not complete his education as his father died in 1939, leaving Mathai to take over the responsibility of the family. Subsequently, he joined the Indian Army in 1944 as a havildar in Pioneer Corps. He served the army for 21 years before superannuating from service in 1965. On his return to Kerala, he founded Saritha Press, in Mavelikkara.

Mathai was married to Ammini, the marriage taking place in 1952. He died on 30 December 1981, at the age of 57.

Legacy 
Parappurath, who earned the moniker "story teller of Onattukara" after his birth place, wrote 20 novels and 14 short story anthologies; his 21st novel, Kaanaapponnu, was incomplete at the time of his death and was later completed by K. Surendran. His multiple award-winning novel, Ara Nazhika Neram, was later adapted as a movie under the same name. Six of his other novels  (Omana, Panitheeraatha Veedu, Ninamaninja Kaalppaadukal, Aadyakiranangal, Makane Ninakku Vendi and Anweshichu Kandethiyilla) were also made into films. He also wrote a play,  Velicham Kuranja Vazhikal and a memoirs, Marikkatha Ormmakal.

Parappurath was involved with literary organizations such as the Sahithya Pravarthaka Co-operative Society (SPCS), where he sat on the Board of Directors from 1974 to 1977, and again from 1980; in 1981, he was elected as its president, a position he held at the time of his death. His film career covered 15 screenplays, of which 14 were based on his own stories. Altogether, he wrote dialogues for 19 films and acted a small part in Aranazhika Neram.

Awards and honours 
Parappurath received the Sahithya Pravarthaka Sahakarana Sangham Award for his work, Naalalu Naaluvazhi in 1965. When Kerala Sahitya Akademi instituted an annual award for the best short story in 1966, his Naalalu Naaluvazhi was again selected for the inaugural award. Two years later, Akademi honoured him again with the Kerala Sahitya Akademi Award for Novel in 1968, Ara Nazhika Neram earning him the award. He received the Kerala State Film Award for Best Story twice, in 1970 for Aranazhika Neram and in 1972, for Panitheeratha Veedu. He was also a recipient of the M. P. Paul Literary Prize.

Bibliography

Novels

Short stories

Play

Memoirs

Translations

Movies

Screenplay

 Ninamaninja Kalpadukal (1963)
 Anweshichu Kandethiyilla (1967)
 Manaswini (1968)
 Aparaadhini (1968)
 Anadha (1970)
 Sthree (1970)
 Karinizhal (1971)
 Makane Ninakku Vendi (1971)
 Iniyoru Janmam Tharoo (1972)
 Akkarappacha (1972)
 Omana (1972)
 Panitheeraatha Veedu (1973)
 Thottavadi (1973)
 Ee Manoharatheeram (1978)

Story

 Ninamaninja Kalpadukal (1963)
 Aadyakiranangal (1964)
 Anweshichu Kandethiyilla (1967)
 Manaswini (1968)
 Anadha (1970)
 Aranazhika Neram (1970)
 Makane Ninakku Vendi (1971)
 Akkarappacha (1972)
 Omana (1972)
 Panitheeraatha Veedu (1973)
 Thottavadi (1973)
 Ee Manoharatheeram (1978)

Dialogue

 Ninamaninja Kalpadukal (1963)
 Tharavattamma (1966)
 Anweshichu Kandethiyilla (1967)
 Manaswini (1968)
 Aparaadhini (1968)
 Anadha (1970)
 Moodalmanju (1970)
 Aranazhika Neram (1970)
 Sthree (1970)
 Karinizhal (1971)
 Makane Ninakku Vendi (1971)
 Iniyoru Janmam Tharoo (1972)
 Akkarappacha (1972)
 Omana (1972)
 Panitheeraatha Veedu (1973)
 Thottavadi (1973)
 Makkal (1975)
 Ee Manoharatheeram (1978)

Acting
Aranaazhikaneram (1970).... Chacko

References

External links 
 
 

Malayali people
People from Alappuzha district
Novelists from Kerala
Malayalam-language writers
Malayalam novelists
Malayalam short story writers
Recipients of the Kerala Sahitya Akademi Award
Malayalam screenwriters
Male actors from Kerala
Year of birth uncertain
1981 deaths
20th-century Indian novelists
Male actors in Malayalam cinema
Indian male film actors
Indian male novelists
20th-century Indian short story writers
Screenwriters from Kerala
20th-century Indian male writers
1924 births
20th-century Indian screenwriters